Gymnanthes integra is a species of plant in the family Euphorbiaceae. It is endemic to Jamaica.  It is threatened by habitat loss.

References

Hippomaneae
Flora of Jamaica
Near threatened plants
Endemic flora of Jamaica
Taxonomy articles created by Polbot